The 1973–74 season was the fourth season of the Portland Trail Blazers in the National Basketball Association (NBA). The Blazers finished at 27–55, a six-game improvement from the previous season.

Draft picks

Information from Sports Reference

Roster

Regular season

Season standings

z – clinched division title
y – clinched division title
x – clinched playoff spot

Record vs. opponents

Game log

Awards and honors
 Sidney Wicks, NBA All-Star
 Geoff Petrie, NBA All-Star

Transactions

 September 27, 1973 – Waived forward Bob Davis
 October 1, 1973 – Signed free agent guard Mo Layton
 October 14, 1973 – Traded guard Rick Adelman to the Chicago Bulls in exchange for a second round pick in the 1974 NBA Draft (Phil Lumpkin was chosen).
 October 31, 1973 – Waived guard Charlie Davis and signed free agent guard Mark Sibley
 December 1, 1973 – Waived guard Mo Layton
 December 26, 1973 – Signed free agent guard Bob Verga
 January 8, 1974 – Waived guard Bernie Fryer
 May 20, 1974 – Forward Ollie Johnson was selected by the New Orleans Jazz in the 1974 NBA Expansion Draft
 June 12, 1974 – Waived guards Mark Sibley and Bob Verga
Transactions via Sports Reference

References

Portland
Portland Trail Blazers seasons
Portland Trail Blazers 1973
Portland Trail Blazers 1973
Portland
Portland